The Yarra Valley Classic is a new addition to the WTA Tour in 2021.

Ashleigh Barty won the title, defeating Garbiñe Muguruza in the final, 7–6(7–3), 6–4.

Due to a delayed schedule because of a COVID-19 case at a tournament quarantine hotel, all matches from the quarterfinal stage forward played a match tiebreaker in the final set (first to ten points, win by two).

Seeds
The top ten seeds received a bye into the second round. 

  Ashleigh Barty (champion) 
  Sofia Kenin (quarterfinals)
  Karolína Plíšková (third round)
  Petra Kvitová (third round)
  Serena Williams (semifinals, withdrew because of right shoulder injury)
  Garbiñe Muguruza (final)
  Petra Martić (third round)
  Markéta Vondroušová (semifinals)

  Donna Vekić (second round)
  Zhang Shuai (withdrew)
  Anastasia Pavlyuchenkova (third round)
  Fiona Ferro (first round)
  Danielle Collins (quarterfinals)
  Nadia Podoroska (quarterfinals)
  Kristina Mladenovic (first round)
  Marie Bouzková (third round)

Draw

Finals

Top half

Section 1

Section 2

Bottom half

Section 3

Section 4

External links
Official entry list

2021 WTA Tour
2021 Singles